SRMSAT is a Nanosatellite built by students at Sri Ramaswamy Memorial University (SRM Institute of Science and Technology, Chennai) in India. The satellite is an Indian Technology demonstration and Earth observation satellite which is operated by the SRM Institute of Science and Technology. This nanosatellite was used to monitor Greenhouse gases in atmosphere.

SRMSAT's primary mission was the development of a nanosatellite platform for future missions. Its secondary mission was monitoring of greenhouse gasses using an Argus Spectrometer.

Specifications
 Its development programme cost around 1.5 crore rupee.
 It had a design life of one year, but is still working  and can be tracked easily on n2yo.com

Launch
It was launched from the Indian Space Research Organisation (ISRO)'s Satish Dhawan Space Centre at Sriharikota in October 2011. atop a Polar Satellite Launch Vehicle (PSLV) C18 rocket. The launch was a multi-payload mission shared with Megha-Tropiques, VesselSat-1 and Jugnu.

Parameters
SRMSAT is controlled by a 28.8 MHz Atmel microcontroller. Communication is via  Ultra high frequency (UHF), with a downlink at 437.5 MHz providing a data rate of 2.4 kbit/s and an uplink at 145.9 MHz with a 1 kbit/s data rate. Attitude control is via solar cell management system (SCDM), an on-board magnetometer and Global Positioning System (GPS) receiver that provide data for magnetorquer coils which interact with the Earth's magnetosphere to change the satellite's orientation.

See also

 2011 in spaceflight

References

External links
 SRM Institute of Science and Technology
 Thoth

Student satellites
Amateur radio satellites
Mini satellites of India
Spacecraft launched in 2011
2011 in India
Nanosatellites